Red Dragon is an Ambazonian separatist militia loyal to the Interim Government of Ambazonia, and is part of the Ambazonia Self-Defence Council. It is led by Lekeaka Oliver, and controls most of Lebialem Division in the Southwest Region, where they have driven away the traditional rulers and local administrators.

On December 31, 2018, the Cameroonian Army claimed to have killed Field Marshal Lekeaka Oliver in Lebialem. His death was quickly denied by the Interim Government of Ambazonia, as well as by sources within the Cameroonian Army. Oliver resurfaced in a video a week later, proving that reports of his death were indeed false. In March 2019, the Cameroonian Army killed "General Ayekeah" of the Red Dragons, as well as two fighters who tried to intervene.

In October 2019, Lekeaka Oliver declared himself Paramount Ruler of Lebialem, drawing condemnation from traditional rulers of the subdivision. Cameroon subsequently launched raids into Lebialem in a failed attempt to capture or kill Oliver, leading to casualties on both sides.

In February 2021, Red Dragon fighters killed at least three traditional rulers in Essoh Attah, Lebialem.

In the Ambazonian leadership crisis, the Red Dragons sided with the faction loyal to Samuel Ikome Sako. The Restoration Council, the legislative arm of the Interim Government, split from Sako's faction in early 2022 and later declared that Marianta Njomia had replaced Sako as president. The Red Dragons now appear to be loyal to Marianta's faction.

Cameroonian security forces including the Rapid Intervention Battalion reportedly located Oliver in Menji, and organized a raid on 12 July 2022. According to the Cameroonian government, Oliver and one of his guards were killed during the attack, while the remaining Red Dragons fled. The Interim Government of Ambazonia confirmed his death days later, but disputed the events leading to his demise; according to his brother Chris Anu, Oliver was killed by an insider who had then tipped off Cameroonian forces about the location of the corpse.

References 

Military of Ambazonia
National liberation movements in Africa
Secessionist organizations
Guerrilla organizations